Indrawati is a rural municipality located in Sindhupalchok District of Bagmati Province of Nepal.

Twin towns – sister cities 

 Jersey City, New Jersey, United States

References

External links
 Official website

Populated places in Sindhupalchowk District
Rural municipalities in Sindhupalchowk District
Rural municipalities of Nepal established in 2017